Leybourne Castle is a 13th-century castle in the parish of Leybourne, Kent. It is situated between West Malling and Larkfield. The two semi circular bastions of the twin towered gatehouse built in 1275 remain and are incorporated into a Tudor farmhouse that was extensively rebuilt around 1930. Some evidence of circular earthworks also remains. The curtain wall was extant until the 18th century but now none of it remains. It has strong links with the similar church very near it.

It is a Grade II* listed building.

Currently it is private property and inaccessible to the public

See also
Roger de Leybourne

References

External links 
Leybourne Castle page at The Gatehouse

Exploring Kent's past, Kent County Council

Castles in Kent
Grade II* listed buildings in Kent